Nifuroxazide (INN) is an oral nitrofuran antibiotic, patented since 1966 and used to treat colitis and diarrhea in humans and non-humans.  It is sold under the brand names Ambatrol, Antinal, Bacifurane, Diafuryl (Turkey), Benol (Pakistan), Pérabacticel (France), Antinal, Diax (Egypt), Nifrozid, Ercefuryl (Romania, Czech Republic, Russia), Erfuzide (Thailand), Endiex (Slovakia), Enterofuryl (Bosnia and Herzegovina, Russia), Pentofuryl (Germany), Nifuroksazyd Hasco, Nifuroksazyd Polpharma (Poland), Topron, Enterovid (Latin America), Eskapar (Mexico), Enterocolin, Terracolin (Bolivia), Apazid (Morocco), Nifroxid (Tunisia), Nifural (Indonesia) and Septidiaryl. It is sold in capsule form and also as a suspension.

History
Maurice Claude Ernest Carron patented the drug in the United States in 1966. Subsequent patents issued to Germano Cagliero of Marxer S.p.A. describe the use of nifuroxazide as an antibiotic used to treat livestock.

Effectiveness in humans
In 1997, in an Ivory Coast promotional leaflet, GlaxoSmithKline claimed that nifuroxazide (under the brand name "Ambatrol") is an anti-dehydration treatment, "neutralise[s] microbacterials" in diarrhoea, and has "a spectrum which covers most enteropathogenic microbacterials, Shigella, Escherichia coli, Salmonella, Staphylococci, Klebsiella, Yersinia". The international non-profit organization Healthy Skepticism, at the time using their former name, Medical Lobby for Appropriate Marketing (MaLAM), disagreed, stating "We have not found any scientific evidence to support these claims."

STAT3 inhibition 

In addition to its antibiotic activity, nifuroxazide has been found to be a potent inhibitor of STAT3, and consequently has been proposed as a cancer treatment.

ALDH1 cancer stem cells 
High aldehyde dehydrogenase (ALDH) 1 enzymatic activity is a marker for cancer stem cell/tumour initiating cell populations in many cancers. Nifuroxazide was found to be bio-activated by ALDH1 enzymes, and shown to selectively kill ALDH1-High melanoma cells in experimental human cell systems and mouse models. ALDH1 is enriched in melanoma patient samples following BRAF and MEK inhibitor treatments, and it has been proposed that nifuroxazide may be useful as a cancer treatment in this context.

References 

Antibiotics
Hydrazides
Phenols
Nitrofurans